Greenmeadow is a suburb of Cwmbran in the county borough of Torfaen, within the historic county boundaries of Monmouthshire, southern Wales, United Kingdom.

Not to be confused with Green Meadow Golf Club, which is on the other side of Cwmbran in Croesyceiliog.

Demographics
At the 2001 Census:
Population 4439 (Torfaen 90,949)
48.7% Male, 51.3% Female
Ages
29.1% aged between 0-15
42.4% aged between 16-44
20.4% aged 45–59/64
8.1% of pensionable age

Education

 Greenmeadow Primary School

External links
 Greenmeadow Community Farm

Villages in Torfaen
Suburbs of Cwmbran
Electoral wards of Torfaen